World Creativity and Innovation Day (#WCID) is a global UN day celebrated on April 21 to raise awareness around the importance of creativity and innovation in problem solving with respect to advancing the United Nations sustainable development goals, also known as the "global goals". The day was created with UN resolution 71/284 with the support of 80 countries. The first World Creativity and Innovation Day was celebrated on April 21, 2018. 

The purpose of the day is to encourage creative multidisciplinary thinking at the individual and group levels which, according to a special report on the creative economy by UNESCO, UNDP, and UNOSSC, has "become the true wealth of nations in the 21st century."

References

United Nations days